Mapa de Cuauhtinchan may refer to:
Mapa de Cuauhtinchan No. 1
Mapa de Cuauhtinchan No. 2
Mapa de Cuauhtinchan No. 3
Mapa de Cuauhtinchan No. 4